Ranzovius californicus is a species of plant bug in the family Miridae. It is found in North America., specifically in the sheet webs of Hololena curta, where it feeds on prey caught in the web.

References

Further reading

 
 

Phylini
Articles created by Qbugbot
Insects described in 1917